Ileitis is an inflammation of the ileum, a portion of the small intestine. Crohn's ileitis is a type of Crohn's disease affecting the ileum. Ileitis is caused by the bacterium Lawsonia intracellularis.
Inflammatory bowel disease does not associate with Lawsonia intracellularis infection.

References

External links 

Inflammations
Noninfective enteritis and colitis